Tianqi (22 January 1621 – 4 February 1628) was the era name of the Tianqi Emperor, the 16th emperor of the Ming dynasty of China, and was used for 7 years.

On 2 October 1627 (Tianqi 7, 24th day of 8th month), the Chongzhen Emperor ascended to the throne and continued to use. The era was changed to Chongzhen in the following year.

Births
 7 March 1621 (Tianqi 1) – Shi Lang, general (d. 1696)
 1623 (Tianqi 3) – Zhu Youlang, Southern Ming emperor (d. 1662)

Deaths
 1621 (Tianqi 1) – An Xifan (安希范), leader of the Donglin movement (b. 1564)
 3 November 1622 (Tianqi 2, 1st day of the 10th month) – Tu Benjun (屠本畯), biologist (b. 1542)

Comparison table

Other regime era names that existed during the same period
 China
 Tianming (天命, 1616–1626): Later Jin — era name of Nurhaci
 Tiancong (天聰, 1627–1636): Later Jin — era name of Hong Taiji
 Ruiying (瑞應, 1621–1629): Ming period — era name of She Chongming (奢崇明)
 Dachengxingsheng (大成興盛) (Dachengxingsheng, 大乘興勝) (1622): Ming period — era name of Xu Hongru (徐鴻儒)
 Yuanjing (元靜, 1622): Ming period — era name of Wan Side (万俟德)
 Vietnam
 Vĩnh Tộ (永祚, 1619–1629): Later Lê dynasty — era name of Lê Thần Tông
 Long Thái (隆泰, 1618–1625): Mạc dynasty — era name of Mạc Kính Khoan
 Japan
 Genna (元和, 1615–1624): era name of Emperor Go-Mizunoo
 Kan'ei (寛永, 1624–1644): era name of Emperor Go-Mizunoo, Empress Meishō and Emperor Go-Kōmyō

See also
 List of Chinese era names
 List of Ming dynasty era names

References

Further reading

External links
中央研究院 兩千年中西曆轉換

Ming dynasty eras